Leyfields is a housing estate in Tamworth, Staffordshire, consisting of 3-storey flats, maisonettes, bungalows and houses. It was built in the 1960s as a postwar housing estate. It joins the Gillway estate, Claremont Road estate and Coton Green.

The estate has St Andrew's Methodist church, a Community Centre, shops and Wigginton Park, the home to Tamworth Rugby Union Football Club.

Leyfields is also part of the Staffordshire County Council division of Perry Crofts and the Tamworth Borough Council ward of Mercian.

Areas of Tamworth, Staffordshire
Housing estates in England